Arven may refer to:

 Arven (1979 film), a Norwegian film
 Arven (2003 film), a Danish film
 Arven (band), a German metal band
 Arven Pharmaceuticals, a Turkish Pharmaceutical company